Park Sang-jin (born 3 March 1987) is a South Korean football player who plays as a fullback for South Korean club that K-League side Gangwon FC.

Club career

Gangwon FC
On 17 November 2009, he parted 2010 K-League draft, but he wasn't called any clubs in 2010 K-League draft. Park was joined Gangwon FC lately in the preseason. His first K-League match was against Pohang Steelers in Pohang that Gangwon lose by 0-4 in away game on 20 March 2010.

Statistics

References

External links
 

1987 births
Living people
Association football defenders
South Korean footballers
Gangwon FC players
K League 1 players
K League 2 players